Didier Neumann (born 13 January 1977) is a French former professional footballer who played as a midfielder.

Career
Neumann was born in Pont-à-Mousson. He played in the 2000 Coupe de la Ligue Final and helped FC Gueugnon win the 1999–2000 Coupe de la Ligue.

Honours
Gueugnon
 Coupe de la Ligue: 2000

References

External links
 

Living people
1977 births
Association football midfielders
French footballers
Ligue 1 players
Ligue 2 players
FC Metz players
FC Gueugnon players
CS Sedan Ardennes players
Montpellier HSC players
Stade Lavallois players
AS Cannes players